Lime is a 1999 album by Swedish dansband Arvingarna. It was released during the year of the band's 10th anniversary.

Track listing
Du vet var jag finns - 4:16
Är du lycklig nu - 3.45
Det svär jag på - 3:33
Sommar och solvarma dar - 3:16
När jag flyger - 4:03
Jag vill ge natten till dig - 4:12
Magdalena - 3:02
Halvvägs hem till dig - 3:38
En ledig sommardag - 2:56
Bye Bye So Long - 3.00
Programmerad kärlek - 3.40
Jag vet vad kärlek är - 3:35
Låt oss bara vara vänner - 3:24
Att va´ kär - 2:50
Jag och min gitarr - 3:48
Det svär jag på - remix - 2:48

Charts

References

1999 albums
Arvingarna albums